Randall and Hopkirk (Deceased) is a British private detective television series, starring Mike Pratt and Kenneth Cope respectively as the private detectives Jeff Randall and Marty Hopkirk. The series was created by Dennis Spooner and produced by Monty Berman, and was first broadcast in 1969 and 1970. In the United States, it was given the title My Partner the Ghost.

ITC Entertainment produced a single series of 26 episodes in 1968 and 1969, which was aired from September 1969 to March 1970. The pilot episode was first broadcast in the United Kingdom on 19 September 1969 by ATV in the Midlands. London Weekend Television broadcast the pilot two days later on 21 September 1969.

The series was remade in 2000, starring Vic Reeves and Bob Mortimer.

The show was parodied as "Curtis & Ballard (Deceased)" in the 1996 BBC Radio 4 comedy series Fab TV.

Plot
In the initial episode, Hopkirk is murdered during an investigation but returns as a ghost. Randall is the only main character able to see or hear him, though certain minor characters are also able to do so in various circumstances throughout the series, such as mediums, drunks, or those under hypnosis.

Production

Conception
The idea for the series was conceived by Dennis Spooner, who had an office adjoining producer Monty Berman at Elstree Studios. They had already collaborated on The Champions. In March 1968, the pair conceived Department S. Spooner's interest in the paranormal, inspired by several feature films, contemplated the possibility of a television series featuring a ghost, and he thought a detective series would offer greater scope for storylines.

The idea was put to Head of ATV Lew Grade but he was not enthusiastic as the series lacked a leading American, which he felt would inhibit overseas sales. However, the synopsis caught the eye of Ralph Smart, who had worked on The Adventures of Robin Hood, The Invisible Man, and Danger Man and he wanted to write the pilot. This convinced Lew Grade to green-light the series.

Casting
The role of Jeff Randall, originally named Steven Randall, was considered for the comedian Dave Allen who had made Tonight with Dave Allen for Lew Grade's ATV. When Allen signed for the BBC attention turned to Mike Pratt who had appeared in a number of episodes of various ITC series and was deemed to be right for the part by the production team including Cyril Frankel, creative consultant on the series.

Marty Hopkirk proved more difficult to cast, and several actors were considered after scouring the pages of casting resource Spotlight. Frankel was at a new Italian restaurant in Soho, London and sitting at the next table was Kenneth Cope, with his wife, and Frankel thought he would be right for the part. Frankel told Monty Berman, directed a screen test and Cope got the part.

Jean Hopkirk, not in the original concept, is portrayed by Australian actress Annette Andre. She was well known to the production team, having appeared in six episodes of The Saint as well as The Baron. She had been short listed for one of the lead roles in The Champions but lost to Alexandra Bastedo, reportedly at the whim of an American CBS executive.

Filming and locations
Filming commenced with the pilot in May 1968 with the aim to shoot a 48-minute episode over a fortnight working Monday to Friday from 8:30am to 5:30pm with some filming on alternate Sundays. The bulk of filming with the main cast was on two sound stages at ABC Elstree in Borehamwood where Department S and other series were also in production. Establishing shots would use library footage. Location sequences were usually filmed by a second unit using stand-ins or the guest cast who were only needed for one episode filmed by one director while the main cast were completing the previous episode with another director. To keep costs down, a simple jump cut was used to make Marty Hopkirk disappear and reappear. Walking through walls was costly and time consuming using an image reflected on plain glass at an angle in front of the camera often used in the theatre called Pepper's ghost.

The exterior of the Randall & Hopkirk's office was a doorway at the side of Adam's Furniture Fabric on the corner of Kymberly Road and Springfield Road in Harrow, now completely redeveloped as St George's Shopping Centre. Jeff Randall's flat was located at Hanover House, close to the corner of St John's Wood High Street, and Jean Hopkirk's flat was on Lauderdale Road, Maida Vale, London.

Numerous country houses in the northern Greater London and Hertfordshire area were used for the external shots of the many mansions featured in the series. In the episode "For the Girl Who Has Everything", the exterior of Hilfield Castle in Aldenham was used for Kim Wentworth's (Lois Maxwell's) home. The Tudor-looking Edgwarebury Hotel on Barnet Lane in Elstree, now The Manor Elstree, was used in the episodes "Who Killed Cock Robin?" and "The House on Haunted Hill" and a plethora of other ITC series. The exterior of the Lambert Clinic in the comical episode "A Disturbing Case", written by Mike Pratt himself, is now the Institute of Grocery Distribution in Letchmore Heath, Hertfordshire. The Seaton Residence, a large white house with Doric columns at the front used in "The Smile Behind the Veil" episode is the Dyrham Park Country Club, the club house of a golf club in Galley Lane, Barnet. Woburn Abbey in Woburn, Bedfordshire, is featured in the episode "The Man from Nowhere" and is visited by Jeannie and a Marty imposter.

Cars

The car Jeff Randall drove was a white Vauxhall Victor registration  which was also used in two episodes of Department S; in that series Joel Fabiani's character Stewart Sullivan drove a white Vauxhall Ventora with the registration RXD 997F. The red Mini used by Jean Hopkirk was registered in May 1964 and had been used in an episode of The Saint (1968), an episode of Department S (1969) and driven by Tony Curtis's character Danny Wilde in an episode of The Persuaders! (1970).

Music
The theme music was composed by Edwin Astley, who in the previous years had composed many themes and incidental music for film series produced and distributed by ITC and its forerunners. Astley used the harpsichord because of its distinctive sound and used the C minor key because of the "death" part in it. In all Astley composed 188 numbered cues used throughout the series. Music composed by Astley from  The Champions was briefly used, as was music by Albert Elms from the same series. Music was also used by Astley from his own library of music, the Chappell library, and other music composed by Robert Farnon, Johnny Hawksworth, Sidney Torch, Vivaldi.

Characters and cast

 Mike Pratt as Jeff Randall, a successful (albeit "slightly seedy" and often morally ambiguous) private detective whose success in solving mysteries becomes inevitably greater once he has the benefits and paranormal abilities of his deceased friend and partner Marty Hopkirk. Randall is short-tempered, becoming particularly irritated with certain situations and people, particularly the ghost of Marty.
 Kenneth Cope as Marty Hopkirk, a private detective and Jeff's partner, who is murdered in the line of duty after being run down by a car travelling at high speed. Hopkirk dies instantly, but returns to help Jeff (the only living person who can see him) bring his killer to justice. Marty remains with Jeff throughout the entire series, a cynical, often perturbed character who torments Jeff as much as helps him. 
 Annette Andre as Jeannie Hopkirk, secretary at the Randall and Hopkirk private investigation office. Widow of Marty. Though resourceful, she can be very naive and vulnerable, putting her own life in danger on many occasions.
 Ivor Dean as Inspector Large (5 episodes), a lugubrious police inspector, always suspicious of Randall and looking to arrest him. Their relationship is highly adversarial, though Randall eventually helps the inspector bring the real culprits to justice.
 Richard Kerley as Sergeant Hinds (3 episodes), Inspector Large's subordinate. 
 Judith Arthy as Jennifer (2 episodes), the sister of Jeannie, who comes to London to visit her sister.
 Garfield Morgan (2 episodes) in different roles in each
 Michael Griffiths as Inspector Nelson (2 episodes), a police inspector who, much like Inspector Dean, treats Randall as a criminal and the first suspect for various crimes.

Other actors

A
 Raymond Adamson
 Neal Arden
 Graham Armitage
 John Arnatt
 Robin Askwith
 Roger Avon
 Felix Aylmer

B
 Anthony Baird
 Simon Barnes
 Patrick Barr
 Keith Barron
 Alexandra Bastedo
 David Bauer
 Norman Beaton
 Bruce Beeby
 Michael Beint
 James Belchamber
 Francis Bennett
 Dick Bentley
 Harold Berens
 Paul Bertoya
 Michael Bird
 Norman Bird
 Caroline Blakiston
 Joby Blanshard
 Brian Blessed
 John Bott
 Tom Bowman
 John Boxer
 Penny Brahms
 Edward Brayshaw
 James Bree
 Susan Broderick
 Ray Brooks
 Arthur Brough
 A. J. Brown
 Gabrielle Brune
 John Bryans
 Denise Buckley
 Keith Buckley
 Alfred Burke
 Jeremy Burnham
 Ian Butler

C
Edward Caddick
Richard Caldicot
Joyce Carey
David Cargill
Veronica Carlson
Martin Carrol
Dave Carter
Ann Castle
John Cazabon
Clive Cazes
Peter Cellier
Nicolas Chagrin
Tricia Chapman
Tom Chatto
Basil Clarke
Carol Cleveland
Linda Cole
Michael Coles
John Collin
Patrick Connor
George A. Cooper
Billy Cornelius
Adrienne Corri
Nicholas Courtney
Clifford Cox
Tracey Crisp
Roger Croucher
James Culliford
Roland Curran

D
Henry Davies
Noel Davis
Anne De Vigier
Hans De Vries
Roger Delgado
Roy Desmond
Arnold Diamond
Basil Dignam
Carol Dilworth
Eric Dodson
James Donnelly
Rosemary Donnelly
David Downer
Terry Duggan
William Dysart

E
Clifford Earl
Meredith Edwards
Christopher Eedy
Peter Jay Elliott
Eva Enger
Norman Eshley
Clifford Evans
Tenniel Evans

F
Max Faulkner
Gerald Flood
David Forbes
Michael Forrest
Dudley Foster
Grazina Frame
John Fraser
Liz Fraser

G
Chris Gannon
John Garvin
Sue Gerrard
Alan Gifford
Michael Goldie
Michael Goodliffe
Howard Goorney
Romo Gorrara
Michael Gothard
Michael Gover
Michael Graham
Danny Green
Earl Green
Keith Grenville
Michael Gwynn

H
Patricia Haines
John Hallam
Olivia Hamnett
Doris Hare
Juliet Harmer
John Harvey
Robin Hawdon
David Healy
Thomas Heathcote
Maurice Hedley
Drewe Henley
Patrick Holt
George Howe
Stuart Hoyle
John Hughes
Geoffrey Hughes
Peter Hughes
Harry Hutchinson

I
Barrie Ingham
Harold Innocent

J
Freda Jackson
Philip James
David Jason
Clare Jenkins
Peter Jesson
Robin John
Dudley Jones
John Glyn-Jones
Peter Jones
Patrick Jordan

K
Bernard Kay
Dermot Kelly
William Kendall
John Kidd
Geoff King

L
Ronald Lacey
Charles Lamb
Jack Lambert
Duncan Lamont
Peter Lawrence
George Lee
Phillip Lennard
Valerie Leon
Sue Lloyd
Charles Lloyd-Pack
Harry Locke
David Lodge
Maggie London
Bessie Love
Olga Lowe
Cyril Luckham
Reg Lye

M
Victor Maddern
Philip Madoc
Marne Maitland
Marie Makino
Dolores Mantez
Anthony Marlowe
Makki Marseilles
Reginald Marsh
Lois Maxwell
Paul Maxwell
Jack MacGowran
Alan MacNaughtan
Neil McCallum
Neil McCarthy
Stanley Meadows
Mary Merrall
Jane Merrow
William Mervyn
Billy Milton
Kieron Moore
Charles Morgan
Donald Morley
George Murcell

N
Gwen Nelson
Patrick Newell

O
Brian Oulton
Richard Owens

P
Ron Pember
Richard Pescud
Terence Plummer
Nosher Powell

R
Carol Rachelle
Ronald Radd
Michael Radford
John Rae
Michael Rathborne
Bill Reed
Geoffrey Reed
Cyril Renison
Marjorie Rhodes
John Richmond
Michael Ripper
Colin Rix
Anton Rodgers
Edina Ronay
Adrian Ropes
Jan Rossini
Robert Russell
Madge Ryan
Paddy Ryan

S
Andrew Sachs
Anthony Sagar
Leslie Schofield
Alex Scott
George Sewell
Cyril Shaps
Ann Sharp
John Sharp
Michael Sheard
David Sinclair
Kevin Smith
Walter Sparrow
William Squire
Tony Steedman
Peter Stephens
David Stoll
John Styles
Dudley Sutton
Ingrid Sylvester

T
Larry Taylor
Nigel Terry
Tony Thawnton
Hilary Tindall
John A. Tinn
Frederick Treves

V
Colin Vancao
Peter Vaughan
Sue Vaughan
Don Vernon

W
John Walker
Gary Watson
Kenneth Watson
David Webb
Timothy West
Phillip Weston
Les White
Frank Windsor
Beverly Winn
Hilary Wontner
Betty Woolfe
Jack Woolgar
Katya Wyeth

Y
Jeremy Young
Raymond Young

Z
Nik Zaran

Episodes
Airdates given here are for London Weekend Television. It was the only ITV region to screen all 26 episodes without breaks in transmission. Other ITV regions varied airdates and transmission order.

Filming took place between May 1968 and July 1969.

Broadcast

The 26 episodes were broadcast in the UK between 26 September 1969 and 31 July 1971; ATV dropped the show after 20 odd episodes had been transmitted. In the United States it was syndicated 1973 under the title My Partner the Ghost. The series has been shown in 2020 in the UK on the Sony Channel, and again in 2022 on the channel Great! TV. As of January 2023, all episodes are available on ITV’s free to air on-demand service ITVX.

Home Media: Blu-Ray 

On  October 2, 2017, the complete series of Randall And Hopkirk (Deceased) was released on blu-ray in the UK by a company called Network. It was newly remastered to HD from the original 35mm element prints.   Though listed as Region B the discs are actually Region A/B/C or Region Free meaning they will also play in American blu-ray players as well.  The episodes on the discs are listed in production order instead of the air date order.

Remakes 

In 2000–2001, the series was remade by Working Title Films for the BBC with a more elaborate storyline, starring Vic Reeves as Hopkirk (once again in a white suit) and Bob Mortimer as Randall, with Emilia Fox as Jeannie. Two series were made. The show was produced and primarily written by Charlie Higson, who also directed some episodes, and featured numerous writers including Gareth Roberts, Mark Gatiss, Paul Whitehouse and Jeremy Dyson. The premise of the show was the same, but the circumstances of Hopkirk's death were changed.

On 10 May 2010, the SyFy Channel announced that it had secured the rights to Randall & Hopkirk (Deceased) and were looking to develop a pilot, and in January 2011, Entertainment Weekly announced that Jane Espenson and Drew Z. Greenberg would be writing a pilot for SyFy. Espenson told io9 that "The version we're proposing is quite different in tone and content from the original." She added, "We took the basic premise of a Ghost Detective and his still-living partner and invented our own take on it."

See also
 List of ghost films

References

External links
 
 randallandhopkirk.com
 randallandhopkirk.org.uk
 British Film Institute Screen Online (60s series)
 ITVX link to all 26 episodes.

1960s British drama television series
1970s British drama television series
1969 British television series debuts
1970 British television series endings
British detective television series
British supernatural television shows
English-language television shows
Fictional detective agencies
ITV television dramas
Occult detective fiction
Television duos
Television series by ITC Entertainment
Television shows set in London
Television shows shot at Associated British Studios